Laird is an unincorporated community and a census-designated place (CDP) located in and governed by Yuma County, Colorado, United States. The population of the Laird CDP was 47 at the United States Census 2010. The Wray post office  serves Laird postal addresses.

Etymology
Laird has the name of James Laird, a Nebraska legislator. "Laird" is the Scots language word for a "lord".

History
The Laird post office began operation in 1887.

Geography

Demographics

See also

Outline of Colorado
Index of Colorado-related articles
State of Colorado
Colorado cities and towns
Colorado census designated places
Colorado counties
Yuma County, Colorado

References

External links

Yuma County website

Census-designated places in Yuma County, Colorado
Census-designated places in Colorado